is a former Japanese football player.

Kimura previously played for Ventforet Kofu in the J2 League.

Club statistics

References

External links

1988 births
Living people
Association football people from Tokyo
Japanese footballers
J1 League players
J2 League players
J3 League players
Japan Football League players
Ventforet Kofu players
Matsumoto Yamaga FC players
Kataller Toyama players
Iwate Grulla Morioka players
Association football forwards